Below there are the squads from the participating teams of the 2012 FIVB Volleyball World League.

C indicates the Captain of the team.
L indicates the Libero of the team.

































References

FIVB Volleyball World League squads
2012 in volleyball